Parsippany–Troy Hills Township, commonly known as Parsippany, is a township in Morris County, New Jersey. As of the 2020 United States census, the township’s population was 56,162, reflecting a 5.5% increase from the 53 238 enumerated at the 2010 U.S. census, in turn an increase of 2,589 (+5.1%) from the 50,649 counted at the 2000 census.

The name Parsippany comes from the Lenape Native American sub-tribe, which comes from the word parsipanong, which means "the place where the river winds through the valley". Parsippany–Troy Hills is the most populous municipality in Morris County. The name Troy Hills was changed from Troy, to avoid confusion of mail being sent erroneously to Troy, New York.

Parsippany–Troy Hills was incorporated as a township by an act of the New Jersey Legislature on March 12, 1928, from portions of Hanover Township, based on the results of a referendum held on May 9, 1928, that split off both East Hanover Township and Parsippany–Troy Hills from Hanover Township.

Since 2006, Parsippany–Troy Hills has been consistently recognized by Money magazine as one of the Best Places to Live in the United States. That year Parsippany was ranked 17th on the list, the highest-ranked location in New Jersey. In 2008, it moved up to 13th position. Parsippany returned to Money magazine's "Best Places" list in 2012, in the 15th position, and again in 2014, where it ranked 16th with Money citing its "arts and leisure". Parsippany's ranking improved to the fifth-ranked position on the "Best Places" list in 2016 but dropped to 33rd in 2017. In 2018, Parsippany again made the list, at the 26th-ranked position. In 2022, Parsippany again made the list, at the 15th place.

History

Geographic 
After the Wisconsin Glacier melted around 13,000 BCE, half of Parsippany was filled with water as this was Lake Passaic. Around the area grasses grew, as the area was tundra and then turned into a taiga/boreal forest as the area warmed.

Native American settlement 
Paleo-Indians moved in small groups into the area around 12,500 years ago, attracted by the diversity of plant and animal life.

Native Americans settled into the area several thousand years ago, dwelling in the highlands and along the Rockaway River and the Whippany River, where they hunted and fished for the various game that lived in the area and migrated through the area in autumn. Paintings in a rock cave were found in the late 1970s in western Parsippany in the highlands.

Dutch settlement 
From 1611 to 1614, the Dutch established the colony of New Netherland, which claimed territory between the 40th and 45th parallel north, a zone which included northern New Jersey. The Native Americans traded furs and food with the Dutch for various goods. In return, the Dutch gave the Native Americans metal pots, knives, guns, axes, and blankets. Trading with the Native Americans occurred until 1643 when a series of wars broke out between the two. There were hostile relations between the Dutch and Native Americans between 1643 and 1660. This prevented colonization by the Dutch of the Morris County region which was technically included in their claimed "New Netherland".

On August 27, 1664, three English ships approached Fort Amsterdam and the fort was surrendered to the English. The English took control of New Netherland and Morris County came under control of the colony of New York. New Jersey was established shortly thereafter. Relations with the Native Americans improved for a while.

There was a war with the Dutch ten years later, with the Dutch retaking control of New Amsterdam, but after a year returned it to the English. Relations with the Native Americans and English improved for a while. English settlers started to move into the area around 1700. The Parsippany area had flat land and fertile soil, and a fresh water supply, allowing them to succeed at farming. All types of game, especially waterfowl, provided colonists a chance to succeed.

Slavery in Parsippany 

From the 1730s to the early 1800s, the area of Parsippany known as Lake Hiawatha was a 2,000-acre (3.125 mile) slave plantation. The central street of Lake Hiawatha, Beverwyck Road, references the name of a Dutch enslaver and property manager Lucas Von Beverhoudt.

Generations of enslaved Africans were forced to labor on the Beverwyck property, including Phebe Ann Jacobs. Born enslaved in 1785 on the Beverwyck plantation, she later achieved freedom in Maine, laundering clothes for students of Bowdoin College. Her posthumously-published 1856 biography, Narrative of Phebe Ann Jacobs, was a source of inspiration to Harriet Beecher Stowe, famed author of anti-slavery novel Uncle Tom's Cabin.

Records include a 1768 newspaper advertisement for the property that mentioned a "Negro House," which was constructed to house over 20 enslaved workers, including a blacksmith, a shoemaker, and a mason. A 1780 newspaper notice includes a description to aid in re-capturing "Jack," an enslaved person who had escaped; this notice can be found at the Morristown National Historical Park.

Guests at the estate included George Washington, Nathaniel Greene, and Marquis de Lafayette.

21st century 
In July 2021, Cinepolis Theaters announced that it permanently closed its theater on Route 46 at the Morris Hills Shopping Center.

Geography
According to the United States Census Bureau, the township had a total area of 25.35 square miles (65.65 km2), including 23.63 square miles (61.20 km2) of land and 1.72 square miles (4.45 km2) of water (6.79%).

Unincorporated communities, localities and place names located partially or completely within the township include Greystone Park, Lake Hiawatha, Lake Intervale, Lake Parsippany, Mount Tabor (also known as "Tabor"), Parsippany, Powder Mill, Rainbow Lakes, Rockaway Neck, and Troy Hills.

Lake Hiawatha and Mount Tabor are neighborhoods with their own ZIP codes. In 2000, 55% of Parsippany residents had a 07054 ZIP code. In 2011, Parsippany residents could live in one of 12 ZIP codes. Until 2000, there was a 13th ZIP code within Parsippany, eliminated with changes at the Greystone Park Psychiatric Hospital.

Parsippany–Troy Hills borders the municipalities of Boonton, Denville Township, East Hanover Township, Hanover Township, Montville, Morris Plains, Morris Township, Mountain Lakes and Randolph.

Climate
The township has a humid continental climate, with cold winters and very warm-to-hot summers. It is usually cooler than Manhattan at night and in the early morning.

Geology

Parsippany–Troy Hills lies in the Newark Piedmont Basin. Around 500 million years ago, a chain of volcanic islands crashed into proto North America, riding over the North American Plate and creating the New Jersey Highlands, which start in the western portion of the township. This strike also created land formations in the rest of eastern New Jersey. Around 450 million years ago, a small continent, long and thin, collided with North America, creating folding and faulting in western New Jersey and southern Appalachia.

The swamps and meadows of Parsippany were created when the North American Plate separated from the African Plate. An aborted rift system or half-graben was created. The land area lowered between the Ramapo Fault in western Parsippany and a fault west of Paterson. The Ramapo Fault goes through the western part of the township.

The Wisconsin Glacier came into the area around 21,000 BCE and left around 13,000 BCE due to a warming in climate. As the glacier slowly melted, this created rivers, streams and lakes, leaving most of the township under Lake Passaic, which was the biggest lake in New Jersey at that time, stretching from the edge of the Ramapo Fault in western Parsippany eastward to almost Paterson.

The area was first tundra when the Wisconsin Glacier melted and then as the area warmed formed taiga/boreal forests, along with vast meadows. Slowly, Lake Passaic drained and formed swamps in the township; Troy Meadows and Lee Meadows (on the old Alderney Farm tract) are perfect examples. Swamps and meadows next to oak forests created a diverse flora and fauna spectrum.

Demographics

Census 2010

The Census Bureau's 2006–2010 American Community Survey showed that (in 2010 inflation-adjusted dollars) median household income was $85,760 (with a margin of error of +/− $2,882) and the median family income was $102,601 (+/− $4,650). Males had a median income of $67,109 (+/− $3,242) versus $50,415 (+/− $2,595) for females. The per capita income for the borough was $40,965 (+/− $1,434). About 1.8% of families and 3.2% of the population were below the poverty line, including 3.5% of those under age 18 and 5.7% of those age 65 or over.

Census 2000
As of the 2000 United States Census, there were 50,649 people, 19,624 households, and 13,167 families residing in the township. The population density was 2,115.5 people per square mile (816.9/km2). There were 20,066 housing units at an average density of 838.1 per square mile (323.6/km2). The racial makeup of the township was 74.28% White, 3.11% African American, 0.12% Native American, 18.06% Asian, 0.06% Pacific Islander, 1.90% from other races, and 2.48% from two or more races. Hispanic or Latino of any race were 6.98% of the population.

There were 19,624 households, out of which 29.5% had children under the age of 18 living with them, 56.2% were married couples living together, 7.6% had a female householder with no husband present, and 32.9% were non-families. 27.1% of all households were made up of individuals, and 6.7% had someone living alone who was 65 years of age or older. The average household size was 2.53 and the average family size was 3.13.

In the township, the age distribution of the population shows 21.0% under the age of 18, 6.7% from 18 to 24, 35.2% from 25 to 44, 25.9% from 45 to 64, and 11.2% who were 65 years of age or older. The median age was 38 years. For every 100 females, there were 97.8 males. For every 100 females age 18 and over, there were 94.7 males.

The median income for a household in the township was $68,133 and the median income for a family was $81,041. Males had a median income of $51,175 versus $38,641 for females. The per capita income for the township was $32,220. About 2.6% of families and 3.9% of the population were below the poverty line, including 4.0% of those under age 18 and 6.3% of those age 65 or over.

Parsippany–Troy Hills has a large Indian American community, with 8.39% of Parsippany–Troy Hills's residents having identified themselves as being of Indian American ancestry in the 2000 Census, which was the eighth-highest of any municipality in New Jersey, for all places with 1,000 or more residents identifying their ancestry.

Economy 
From 1967 through 2015, the Vince Lombardi Trophy was exclusively handcrafted by Tiffany & Co. in Parsippany for the winning team of the Super Bowl, as is the Larry O'Brien Championship Trophy granted to the winner of the NBA Finals.

Allergan, B&G Foods, GAF Materials Coproration, Sun Chemical, Zoetis, Kings Food Markets, Lexus and Toyota Financial Services, American Financial Resources, Wyndham Worldwide Toys "R" Us, along with its parent company, Tru Kids, and PNY Technologies, a manufacturer of computer memory devices, are in Parsippany–Troy Hills.

The U.S. operations of Cadbury Adams, Reckitt Benckiser, Ricola and Safilo are located here.

Cendant Corporation moved its headquarters to Parsippany–Troy Hills in 2001; in 2006 Cendant separated into several different companies, including Avis Budget Group, parent company of Avis Rent a Car System and Budget Rent a Car.

Sports
Parsippany SC is a soccer club that hosts teams in both the Super Y-League and the Super-20 League.

Par–Troy Little League East, one of Parsippany's two township Little League teams, competed in the 2012 Little League World Series, losing in the third round of play at South Williamsport, Pennsylvania to a team from Petaluma, California.

Government

Local government 
The township is governed within the Faulkner Act (formally known as the Optional Municipal Charter Law) under the Mayor-Council system of municipal government (Plan E), implemented based on the recommendations of a Charter Study Commission as of January 1, 1966. The township is one of 71 municipalities (of the 564) statewide that use this form of government. The governing body is comprised of the mayor and the five-member township council, all elected to four-year terms of office on an at-large basis in partisan elections held in odd-numbered years as part of the November general election. Either two or three council seats are up for vote each election, with the mayoral seat up for vote at the same time that two seats are up for vote. The mayor and council are separately elected, with the mayor, serving as the chief executive officer, and the council serving in the capacity of a legislative body.

Some responsibilities of the mayor include preparation of the budget, enforcement of the ordinances, supervision of municipal departments and property, execution of Council decisions, and oversight of other functions of the municipality. Some of the responsibilities of the Council include adopting ordinances, approval of contracts presented by the mayor, scheduling times and places for council meetings and designation of the official newspapers of the municipality.

, the mayor of Parsippany–Troy Hills is Democrat Michael Soriano, whose term of office ends December 31, 2021. In the 2017 general election, Democratic challenger Michael Soriano defeated two-term incumbent Republican Mayor James R. Barberio; Soriano won with 7,438 votes (52.92%), and his running mates Emily Peterson and Janice McCarthy swept the two council seats, ousting incumbents Council President Louis A. Valori and Vincent Ferrara. Peterson won with 26.61% or 7,088 votes, and McCarthy won with 26.97% or 7,186 votes. Parsippany–Troy Hills's Township Council consists of Michael J. dePierro (R, 2023), Council Vice President Loretta Gragnani (R, 2023), Paul Carifi Jr. (R, 2023), Justin Musella (R, 2025) and Frank Neglia (R,2025).

James Barberio unseated incumbent Mayor Michael Luther (D) by a margin of 8% in 2009, in an election in which Republicans took hold of all of the township's elected offices.

In November 2012, Jonathan Nelson became the first Democrat elected to the Township Council in 26 years after upsetting Mayor James R. Barberio's candidate, Republican Judy Tiedemann.

List of mayors 

 John E. J. Walsh (D) 1966 (died)
 Henry Luther (D) 1966–1974 (retired)
 Jack Fahy (D) 1974–1982 (lost reelection)
 Frank Priore (R) 1982–1994 (removed from office, indicted, served time)
 Mimi Letts (D) 1994–2005 (retired)
 Michael Luther (D) 2006–2010 (lost reelection)
 Jamie Barberio (R) 2010–2018 (lost reelection)
 Michael Soriano (D) 2018–2022 (lost reelection)
 Jamie Barberio (R) 2022–present

Federal, state and county representation 
Parsippany–Troy Hills Township is located in the 11th Congressional District and is part of New Jersey's 26th state legislative district.

 

Morris County is governed by a Board of County Commissioners comprised of seven members who are elected at-large in partisan elections to three-year terms on a staggered basis, with either one or three seats up for election each year as part of the November general election. Actual day-to-day operation of departments is supervised by County Administrator, John Bonanni. , Morris County's Commissioners are
Commissioner Director Tayfun Selen (R, Chatham Township, term as commissioner ends December 31, 2023; term as director ends 2022),
Commissioner Deputy Director John Krickus (R, Washington Township, term as commissioner ends 2024; term as deputy director ends 2022),
Douglas Cabana (R, Boonton Township, 2022), 
Kathryn A. DeFillippo (R, Roxbury, 2022),
Thomas J. Mastrangelo (R, Montville, 2022),
Stephen H. Shaw (R, Mountain Lakes, 2024) and
Deborah Smith (R, Denville, 2024).
The county's constitutional officers are the County Clerk and County Surrogate (both elected for five-year terms of office) and the County Sheriff (elected for a three-year term). , they are 
County Clerk Ann F. Grossi (R, Parsippany–Troy Hills, 2023),
Sheriff James M. Gannon (R, Boonton Township, 2022) and
Surrogate Heather Darling (R, Roxbury, 2024).

Politics
As of March 23, 2011, there were a total of 30,393 registered voters in Parsippany–Troy Hills Township, of which 7,022 (23.1%) were registered as Democrats, 10,046 (33.1%) were registered as Republicans and 13,310 (43.8%) were registered as Unaffiliated. There were 15 voters registered to other parties.

In the 2020 presidential election, out of 27,802 votes cast, Democrat Joe Biden received 55.3% of the vote (15,369  votes), Republican Donald Trump received 43.5% of the vote (12,095 votes) and other candidates received 1.2% of the vote (338 votes).

In the 2012 presidential election, Democrat Barack Obama received 52.7% of the vote (11,324 cast), ahead of Republican Mitt Romney with 46.3% (9,948 votes), and other candidates with 1.1% (233 votes), among the 21,673 ballots cast by the township's 32,187 registered voters (168 ballots were spoiled), for a turnout of 67.3%. In the 2008 presidential election, Democrat Barack Obama received 51.7% of the vote (12,219 cast), ahead of Republican John McCain with 46.9% (11,091 votes) and other candidates with 1.0% (225 votes), among the 23,635 ballots cast by the township's 31,458 registered voters, for a turnout of 75.1%. In the 2004 presidential election, Republican George W. Bush received 51.8% of the vote (11,433 ballots cast), outpolling Democrat John Kerry with 47.1% (10,397 votes) and other candidates with 0.6% (168 votes), among the 22,061 ballots cast by the township's 30,505 registered voters, for a turnout percentage of 72.3.

In the 2013 gubernatorial election, Republican Chris Christie received 65.5% of the vote (9,083 cast), ahead of Democrat Barbara Buono with 32.8% (4,547 votes), and other candidates with 1.6% (228 votes), among the 14,280 ballots cast by the township's 32,046 registered voters (422 ballots were spoiled), for a turnout of 44.6%. In the 2009 gubernatorial election, Republican Chris Christie received 53.3% of the vote (8,384 ballots cast), ahead of  Democrat Jon Corzine with 36.8% (5,794 votes), Independent Chris Daggett with 7.5% (1,176 votes) and other candidates with 0.7% (114 votes), among the 15,742 ballots cast by the township's 30,870 registered voters, yielding a 51.0% turnout.

Fire protection 
Parsippany–Troy Hills Township is protected by six different fire districts serving out of ten fire houses throughout the township. Each district operates as their own fire department with each having its own Chief and other line officers. Every district is 100% volunteer and are on call around the clock, with dispatching for all fire districts provided by the township police department.

District 1: Mount Tabor Fire Department (Mount Tabor / west side of town), founded in 1910.
District 2: Rainbow Lakes Fire Department (Rainbow Lakes section)
District 3: Lake Parsippany Fire Department (Lake Parsippany Section), founded in 1935.
District 4: Lake Hiawatha Fire Department (Lake Hiawatha Section), established in 1935.
District 5: Rockaway Neck Fire Department (East side of the township)
District 6: Parsippany – Troy Hills Fire District 6 (Central part of the township), founded in 1929. Provides fire protection to Tivoli Gardens, Cambridge Village, Hills of Troy, Morris Hills Shopping Center, Green Hill Shopping Center, Hilton/Hampton Hotels, Sylvan way and Campus Drive Area, Jefferson Road Area, Lake Intervale, and Mazdabrook Housing and Senior centers, as well as sections of I-80, I-287, 46, 10, and 202, with stations at 60 Littleton Road (Main station) and Smith Road (sub-station).

Education

Public schools
The Parsippany–Troy Hills School District serves students in pre-kindergarten through twelfth grade. The Parsippany–Troy Hills School District has students in ten elementary schools, two middle schools, two high schools and an adult education center. The community served by the district is ethnically, culturally and linguistically diverse. As of the 2018–19 school year, the district, comprised of 14 schools, had an enrollment of 7,248 students and 643.8 classroom teachers (on an FTE basis), for a student–teacher ratio of 11.3:1. Schools in the district (with 2018–19 enrollment data from the National Center for Education Statistics) are Eastlake Elementary School (350 students; in grades Pre-K–5), Intervale Elementary School (278; K–5), Knollwood Elementary School (414; K–5), 
Lake Hiawatha Elementary School (408; Pre-K–5), 
Lake Parsippany Elementary School (283; K–5), 
Littleton Elementary School (405; K–5), 
Mt. Tabor Elementary School (449; K–5), 
Northvail Elementary School (371; K–5), 
Rockaway Meadow Elementary School (257; K–5), 
Troy Hills Elementary School (260; K–5), 
Brooklawn Middle School (918; 6–8), 
Central Middle School (789; 6–8), 
Parsippany High School (913; 9–12) and Parsippany Hills High School (1,075; 9–12).

Private schools
Parsippany Christian School, established in 1970, served students in preschool through twelfth grade as a ministry of Parsippany Baptist Church  prior to its closure in 2019.

All Saints' Academy serves preschool though eighth grade, as the result of a 2009 merger of Saint Christopher Parochial school and Saint Peter the Apostle School. St. Elizabeth School, founded in 1970, offers Montessori education to children in preschool through sixth grade. Both are Catholic schools operated under the auspices of the Roman Catholic Diocese of Paterson.

Popular culture references
 In the Seinfeld episode “The Mom & Pop Store” (originally aired on November 17, 1994), Jerry loses his shoes and finds out that they ended up at a garage sale in Parsippany.
 In The Karate Kid, Daniel's Uncle Louie is said to be from Parsippany.
 In the movie The Ex,  Wesley (Lucian Maisel) states, "So during the school year I live with my mom in New Jersey. And I spend the summer here with my dad. But he's at work all the time, and all my friends live back in Parsippany, so it's pretty gay."

Transportation

Roads and highways

Parsippany lies at the crossroads of many major roadways including Interstates 80, 280 (including its western terminus) and 287, U.S. Routes 46 and 202, New Jersey Routes 10 and 53, as well as County Route 511. In 2013, Route 53 was renamed as the "Alex DeCroce Memorial Highway" in honor of Alex DeCroce, a township resident who was a member of the New Jersey General Assembly from 1989 until his death in 2012.

Public transportation
The Mount Tabor station in neighboring Denville Township offers train service on the NJ Transit Morristown Line, with service to and from Penn Station in Midtown Manhattan and Hoboken Terminal.

NJ Transit provides bus service on the 79 route to and from Newark, with local service on the 871, 872, 873, 874, 875, 880, 29 and 79 routes.

The Taiwanese airline China Airlines provides private bus service to John F. Kennedy International Airport from Parsippany to feed its flight to Taipei, Taiwan.

Parsippany runs a tax-payer-funded two-route bus system known as Parsippany Transit that offers bus service at no additional cost to all residents and operates only on weekdays. No Holidays or weekends.

Bus service to the Port Authority Bus Terminal in Midtown Manhattan is provided by Lakeland Bus Lines along Route 46 and Interstate 80.

Notable people

People who were born in, residents of, or otherwise closely associated with Parsippany–Troy Hills

 Charlie Ayers (born 1966), former executive chef for Google
 Joe Bernard (born 1963), college football coach who was head coach of the Fairfield Stags football team in 2001 and 2002
 Debbie Bramwell-Washington (born 1966), IFBB professional bodybuilder
 R. J. Cobbs (born 1982), defensive back who has played in the NFL for the New York Giants, person of interest in 2012 hit and run in Morristown, New Jersey
 Darron Collins (born 1970), human ecologist and academic administrator specializing in ethnobotany, who became president of the College of the Atlantic in 2011
 Clarence Curry (born 1981), defensive specialist who played in the NFL for the Arizona Cardinals
 Dillon Danis (1993/1994), professional mixed martial artist who competes in the Welterweight division of Bellator MMA.
 Bobby Darin (1936–1973), singer, songwriter and actor known for such songs as "Splish Splash", "Dream Lover", "Mack the Knife", and "Beyond the Sea"
 Alex DeCroce (1936–2012), member of the New Jersey General Assembly from 1989 until his death in 2012, who was memorialized with the renaming of Route 53 as the "Alex DeCroce Memorial Highway"
 BettyLou DeCroce (born 1952), politician who was sworn into the General Assembly in 2012 to succeed her husband
 Michael Dogbe (born 1996), defensive end for the Arizona Cardinals
 Bobby Edwards (born 1995), soccer goalkeeper for FC Cincinnati in Major League Soccer
 Sherman Edwards (1919–1981), songwriter best known for writing the lyrics and music for the musical 1776
 Keith Ferris (born 1929), artist/creator of the B-17 mural "Fortresses Under Fire", World War II wing, National Air and Space Museum, Smithsonian Institution, Washington, D.C.
 Dean Gallo (1935–1994), represented  from 1985 until his death
 Jessica Lee Goldyn (born 1985), Broadway actress
 Bill Hands (1940–2017), Major League Baseball pitcher
 Phebe Ann Jacobs (1785 - 1850), Congregationalist born into slavery on the Beverwyck plantation in Lake Hiawatha, New Jersey. After being enslaved for most of her life, she became a devout member of the United Church of Christ. Her posthumous biography was one of the inspirations for Harriet Beecher-Stowe's abolitionist novel Uncle Tom's Cabin.
 James Jean (born 1979), award-winning artist and illustrator
 Danielle Jonas (born 1986), wife of Kevin Jonas and reality star who appears in Married to Jonas
 Jane Krakowski (born 1968), actress, best known for her roles on Ally McBeal and 30 Rock
 Steve Krisiloff (born 1946), race car driver who started the Indianapolis 500 in 11 races
 George Kurtz (born ), co-founder and CEO of cybersecurity company CrowdStrike, who was the founder of Foundstone and chief technology officer of McAfee
 Robert Lazzarini (born 1965), sculptor and installation artist
 Fei-Fei Li (born 1976), professor of computer science at Stanford University, who is director of the Stanford Artificial Intelligence Lab (SAIL) and the Stanford Vision Lab
 Nelson Lyon (1939–2012), writer, actor, photographer and film director, known for his directorial debut The Telephone Book
 Paul Mirabella (born 1954), pitcher who played for 13 seasons in Major League Baseball
 Johnnie Morant (born 1981), wide receiver for the Oakland Raiders (2004–2006)
 Edward Mosberg (1926-2022), Polish-American Holocaust survivor, educator and philanthropist
 Jeff Okudah (born 1999), cornerback for the Detroit Lions
 Joe Orsulak (born 1962), major league baseball player
 Garrett Reisman (born 1968), NASA astronaut
 Zoogz Rift (1953–2011), musician, painter and professional wrestling personality
 Joe Rigoli (born 1956), baseball scout for the St. Louis Cardinals
 Angelo Savoldi (1914–2013), former professional wrestler
 Herb Scherer (1929–2012), professional basketball player for the Tri-Cities Blackhawks and New York Knicks
 Chris Singleton (born 1967), linebacker for the New England Patriots (1990–1992, 1993) and Miami Dolphins (1993, 1994–1996)
 Tommy Vigh Jr. (born 1964), race car driver in the ARCA Menards Series
 Richie Zisk (born 1949), former major league baseball player

References

External links

Parsippany–Troy Hills Township website
Parsippany–Troy Hills School District

School Data for the Parsippany–Troy Hills School District, National Center for Education Statistics

 
1928 establishments in New Jersey
Faulkner Act (mayor–council)
Populated places established in 1928
Townships in Morris County, New Jersey